River Atlético Clube, commonly referred to as River, is a Brazilian professional club based in Teresina, Piauí founded on 1 March 1946. It competes in the Campeonato Piauiense, the top flight of the Piauí state football league.

River is currently ranked third among Piauí teams in CBF's national club ranking, at 107th place overall.

History
On March 1, 1946, considered by the River the official date of founding of the club. A group of students from "Ginásio Leão XIII", at the time directed by professor Antilhon Ribeiro Soares, met to discuss the founding of a sports society that would take the name of River Atlético Clube.

However, the project was not put into practice, since its legalization did not take place in the competent sports bodies, nor was there any record of any activity in the years 1946 and 1947. The first historical record dates from February 15, 1948. That day was played the first game of the River against Amarantino. River's first goal was scored in this game by Antônio Freire (Freirinho). The game was held in the city of Amarante-PI and the River won by 4-3. Almost a month later, on March 12, 1948, there was the so-called 'reorganization' of the club, led by Afrânio Messias Alves Nunes (River's most successful president - 11 titles). On March 15, 1948, the River had already been admitted to the Piauiense Sports Federation. In the same year, it disputed the championship of the season, of which it became champion.

In 1977, the club competed in the Brazilian Championship for the first time, finishing in the 41st place. The club competed in the championship again in 1978, finishing in the 69th place, in 1979, finishing in the 83rd place, in 1981, finishing in the 39th place, and in 1982, finishing in the 44th place.

In 2000, River competed in the Copa João Havelange, which was the competition that replaced the Brazilian Championship in that year. The club was in the yellow module (which was that season's equivalent to the second level), and was eliminated in the first stage.

Stadium

The club's home matches are usually played at Governador Alberto Tavares Silva stadium, nicknamed Albertão  which has a maximum capacity of 60,000 people.

River also plays at Estádio Lindolfo Monteiro, nicknamed Lindolfinho, which has a maximum capacity of 8,000 people.

Rivengo
The derby between Ríver and Esporte Clube Flamengo is known as Rivengo, a truncation of the clubs' names, River and Flamengo.

Club colors and mascot
River's official colors are red, black and white.

The club's mascot is a rooster.

Honours
 Campeonato Piauiense
 Winners (31): 1948, 1950, 1951, 1952, 1953, 1954, 1955, 1956, 1958, 1959, 1960, 1961, 1962, 1963, 1973, 1975, 1977, 1978, 1980, 1981, 1989, 1996, 1999, 2000, 2001, 2002, 2007, 2014, 2015, 2016, 2019

 Copa Piauí
 Winners (1): 2006

References

External links
 Official Site
 River on Globo Esporte

River Atlético Clube
Association football clubs established in 1946
Football clubs in Piauí
Football clubs in Brazil
Teresina
1946 establishments in Brazil